Delta Theta Phi is a professional law fraternity and a member of the Professional Fraternity Association. Delta Theta Phi is the only one of the two major law fraternities to charter chapters (senates) in the United States at non-American Bar Association-approved law schools. Delta Theta Phi can trace its roots to Delta Phi Delta on September 15, 1900 at the then-named Cleveland Law School, now Cleveland-Marshall College of Law in Ohio. Delta Theta Phi has initiated more than 138,000 members across the country and in several other nations.

Delta Theta Phi is the only law fraternity with an authoritatively recognized law review, The Adelphia Law Journal. Membership is the only requirement to submit a note for consideration for publication.

Governance
The governing body for the fraternity, called the Supreme Senate, has overseen the operation of the fraternity since 1913. The Supreme Senate was originally composed of seven elected officers until a student was added to the board to assure a more complete student representation. In the 1970s, a second student position was added.

History

Delta Theta Phi was established , by the amalgamation or union of three previously existing professional fraternities, viz.: Alpha Kappa Phi, Delta Phi Delta and Theta Lambda Phi.

Consolidating Groups

Delta Phi Delta
 
Delta Phi Delta (law) was founded at the Cleveland Law School of Baldwin University, September 15, 1900, by C. E. Schmick, E. Quigley, F. W. Sinram, J. L. Barrett, W. F. Mackay, J. H. Orgill and Arthur Born. It went national with the establishment of a Beta chapter (now the Harlan-McKusick Senate) at the University of South Dakota School of Law in 1904. Delta Phi Delta's Magazine was The Syllabus, first published in 1911. Delta Theta Phi now uses that name for the newsletter distributed to elected members of the administrative organization.

Alpha Kappa Phi
Alpha Kappa Phi was founded at the law school of Northwestern University October 6, 1902. Seeking to secure the advantage of an earlier date of origin its founders took the name of an old undergraduate fraternity called Alpha Kappa Phi which originated at Centre College, Ky., in 1858 and established a number of chapters in the South, the last one of which at the University of Mississippi became Beta Beta chapter of Beta Theta Pi in 1879, becoming extinct a few years later. They also sought to secure some sanction for their conduct by securing permission of the living members of the extinct society to such assumption of their abandoned name. But no expedient of this kind could alter the date of the organization of this fraternity or serve as a basis for a claim to an earlier date than 1902.

The fraternity became national in 1904 with the installation of the Beta chapter at Illinois College of Law (now the Warvelle Senate at DePaul University College of Law).

Theta Lambda Phi
Theta Lambda Phi was founded February 18, 1903, at the law school of Dickinson College by Thomas S. Lanard and Walter P. Bishop. The first chapter was founded as the Holmes chapter with permission of Oliver Wendell Holmes Jr. A representative of West Publishing when visiting the law school learned of the formation of the fraternity, and the next issue of the Docket (published by West) announced the organization of Theta Lambda Phi as a new national law fraternity. Students at the Detroit College of Law, after seeing the article formed the Cooley chapter to actually make the fraternity national. In November 1903, Theta Lambda Phi started The Paper Book as its official form of communication. Delta Theta Phi still uses that name for its official publication mailed to all members.

Sigma Nu Phi

Sigma Nu Phi was founded in 1903 at National University School of Law. In 1916, Sigma Nu Phi started publishing The Owl.

Delta Theta Phi merged with Sigma Nu Phi in 1989, taking all of Sigma Nu Phi members into membership and gaining The Adelphia Law Journal, giving Delta Theta Phi its own authoritatively recognized law review.

Chapter List
As of 1920, the following senates (chapters) existed, with fourteen having been established after consolidation. There are now more than 150 student senates of Delta Theta Phi.  Schools in italics are now closed.

Delta Theta Phi has chartered a number of additional chapters since 1920. The national website does not list its chapters, so until a current reference is established this list does not include those new chapters nor those gained through the national merger in 1989 with Sigma Nu Phi.

Notes

Notable members
Notable initiates of Delta Theta Phi Law Fraternity include four U.S. Presidents (Theodore Roosevelt, William Taft, Calvin Coolidge, and Lyndon B. Johnson), Robert Menzies, an Australian Prime Minister, nine Chief or Associate Justice of the Supreme Court of the United States, including among them Edward Douglass White, Jr., Charles Evans Hughes, Oliver Wendell Holmes, Jr., Harry Blackmun, John Paul Stevens, Sandra Day O’Connor, and William K. Suter, Alfred Lawrence, 1st Baron Trevethin, a Lord Chief Justice of England, 33 current or former U.S. Senators and 77 current or former U.S. Representatives and at least one state representative (Illinois) David Ivar Swanson.

See also 
 Order of the Coif (honor society, law)
 The Order of Barristers (honor society, law; litigation)
 Phi Delta Phi (honor society, law; was a professional fraternity)
 Alpha Phi Sigma (honor society, criminal justice)
 Lambda Epsilon Chi (honor society, paralegal)
 Professional fraternities and sororities

References

Student organizations established in 1900
Professional legal fraternities and sororities in the United States
Professional Fraternity Association
1900 establishments in Ohio